The Nearctic Stakes is a Canadian Thoroughbred horse race run annually in mid October at Woodbine Racetrack in Toronto, Ontario. The Grade II sprint is raced on turf over a distance of six furlongs and currently offers a purse of $232,290.

Previously a Grade II race, it was upgraded to Grade I status for 2010 but has returned to Grade II.

Inaugurated in 1973 to honor Windfield's Farms champion  Nearctic, the 1958 Canadian Horse of the Year, Canadian Horse Racing Hall of Fame inductee, and sire of the 20th Century's most important sire, Northern Dancer. 

The Nearctic Stakes was raced on dirt until 1995 when it was shifted to the Turf.

Records
Speed  record on turf: 
 1:07.60 - Wild Zone (1996)

Speed  record on dirt: 
 1:09.00 - Megas Vukefalos (1992)

Most wins:
 2 - Play The King (1987, 1988)
 2 - Wild Zone (1995, 1996)

Most wins by an owner:
 3 - Sam-Son Farm (1978, 1989, 2003)

Most wins by a jockey:
 4 - Robin Platts (1973, 1974, 1975, 1979)

Most wins by a trainer:
 3 - Daniel J. Vella (1990, 1994, 1995)

Winners of the Nearctic Stakes

See also
 List of Canadian flat horse races

Graded stakes races in Canada
Turf races in Canada
Open sprint category horse races
Breeders' Cup Challenge series
Woodbine Racetrack
Recurring sporting events established in 1973
1973 establishments in Ontario